Mường Tè is a rural district of Lai Châu province in the Northwest region of Vietnam. As of 2012, the district had a population of 39,921. The district covers an area of 2,679.34 km². The district capital lies at Mường Tè.  Mường is equivalent to Mueang.

In 2012, the eastern portion of the district was carved out to form Nậm Nhùn district.

The district is subdivided to 14 commune-level subdivisions, including Mường Tè township and the rural communes of: Bum Nưa, Bum Tở, Kan Hồ, Ka Lăng, Mù Cả, Mường Tè, Nậm Khao, Pa Ủ, Pa Vệ Sử, Tá Bạ, Tà Tổng, Thu Lũm and Vàng San.

Geography
The district lies in the western part of Lai Châu Province, to the west of Nậm Nhùn district. There are various ethnic minorities of people such as the Tai, Hmong, Lahu, Hani, Si La and Phunoi.

References 

Districts of Lai Châu province